Spider-Man is a 1981–1982 American animated TV series based on the Marvel Comics character of the same name. It is the second Spider-Man cartoon, following the 1967–1970 series.

Synopsis 
The series featured Peter Parker having to balance his alter ego crimefighting with his responsibilities as a university student, a part-time photographer for the Daily Bugle and caring for his elderly Aunt May Parker.

While Spider-Man fights his usual enemies, five episodes have him contending with Doctor Doom.

Cast 
 Ted Schwartz - Spider-Man/Peter Parker
 Jack Angel - Dr. Donald Blake (in "Wrath of the Sub-Mariner"), Man Mountain Marko (in "Wrath of the Sub-Mariner"), Moe (in "Triangle of Evil")
 Lee Bailey - Robbie Robertson
 William Boyett - Hammerhead (in "Wrath of the Sub-Mariner")
 Wally Burr - Sam Block
 Corey Burton - Lizard (in "Lizards, Lizards Everywhere")
 Philip L. Clarke - Sidewinder/Wild Willie Wilson (in "The Sidewinder Strikes")
 Regis Cordic - Ringmaster (in "Carnival of Crime"), Professor Gizmo (in "The Unfathomable Professor Gizmo")
 Henry Corden - Dr. Niemann (in "The Capture of Captain America")
 Brad Crandall - Doctor Doom
 Peter Cullen - Red Skull (in "The Capture of Captain America"), Stuntman/Jack Riven (in "Triangle of Evil")
 Brian Cummings - Empire State University Principal (in "The Pied Piper of New York Town"), General (in "The Pied Piper of New York Town")
 Jeff David - Nephilia/Dr. Bradley Shaw (in "The Web of Nephilia")
 Jack DeLeon - Kraven the Hunter (in "The Hunter and the Hunted")
 Ralph James - Goron (in "The A-B-C's of D-O-O-M")
 Lynn Johnson - Akim (in "The Doom Report")
 Morgan Lofting - Aunt May, Black Cat (in "Curiosity Killed the Spider-Man")
 Mona Marshall - Betty Brant, Rodeo Girl (in "The Sidewinder Strikes"), Boy Victor Von Doom (in "Cannon of Doom")
 George DiCenzo - Captain America (in "The Capture of Captain America"), Wizard (in "Under the Wizard's Spell")
 Walker Edmiston - Magneto (in "When Magneto Speaks.... People Listen")
 Ron Feinberg - Cat Burglar (in "Arsenic and Aunt May")
 Brian Fuld - Johan Klemmie, Young Reed Richards (in "Cannon of Doom"), Young Victor Von Doom (in "Cannon of Doom")
 Linda Gary - Colleen (in "Arsenic and Aunt May")
 Buster Jones - Acting Teacher
 Stan Jones - Doctor Octopus (in "Bubble, Bubble, Oil and Trouble"), Kingpin (in "Wrath of the Sub-Mariner" and "The Return of the Kingpin")
 Les Lampson - Shlocker (in "Triangle of Evil")
 John H. Mayer - Chameleon (in "Arsenic and Aunt May"), Police Sergeant (in "Arsenic and Aunt May")
 Don Messick - Vulture (in "The Vulture Has Landed"), Hank Edwards (in "The Vulture Has Landed")
 Arlin Miller - Ka-Zar (in "The Hunter and the Hunted")
 Vic Perrin - Sub-Mariner (in "Wrath of the Sub-Mariner"), Caesar Cicero (in "Wrath of the Sub-Mariner")
 Tony Pope - Boris (in "The Doctor Prescribes Doom", "Canon of Doom", "The Doom Report")
 Richard Ramos - Gadgeteer/Joshua (in "The Incredible Shrinking Spider-Man")
 Gene Ross - Larry (in "Triangle of Evil")
 Neil Ross - Green Goblin/Norman Osborn (in "Revenge of the Green Goblin"), Michael (in "Countdown to Doom")
 Michael Rye - Mysterio (in "The Pied Piper of New York Town")
 Marilyn Schreffler - Sally Ann Beaumont (in "The Sandman is Coming")
 Gary Seger - Johnny Griffon (in "Curiosity Killed the Spider-Man"), Beyond Belief Host (in "Triangle of Evil")
 Michael Sheehan - Mortimer (in "Bubble, Bubble, Oil and Trouble", "Dr. Doom, Master of the World", "The Hunter and the Hunted")
 John Stephenson - Dr. Norton (in "The Incredible Shrinking Spider-Man")
 Andre Stojka - Sandman (in "The Sandman is Coming"), Professor Higgins
 B.J. Ward - Namorita (in "Wrath of the Sub-Mariner"), Medusa (in "Under the Wizard's Spell")
 Paul Winchell - Silvermane (in "Wrath of the Sub-Mriner"), Uncle Ben (in "Arsenic and Aunt May")
 William Woodson - J. Jonah Jameson, Professor Donaldson (in "The Vulture Has Landed"), Dr. Everett (in "Wrath of the Sub-Mariner")

Note: Neil Ross would reprise his role as Norman Osborn/the Green Goblin for the 1994 Spider-Man cartoon series.

Walter S. Burr was the Voice Director for the series.

Episodes

Production

Background 
The series was created to launch Marvel Productions, successor of DePatie–Freleng Enterprises, who had previously produced the 1978 New Fantastic Four and 1979 Spider-Woman animated series (where Spider-Man made two appearances).

Character designs 
The character design for Peter Parker (as well as other supporting characters including Aunt May and J. Jonah Jameson) was quite faithful to the comic books of the period and hearkened back to the illustrations by John Romita Sr. of the young hero in Spider-Man's newspaper strip adventures from the 1970s. Due to network constraints and demands from parents, characters such as Spider-Man were not allowed to make a fist to strike an opponent, but the show's creators managed to conceal these issues with a focus on action and relatively fluid animation.

Much like the Spider-Man newspaper strip of the late 1970s, Peter Parker's character design did away with the 1960s crew cut for a more modern hairstyle during this time, which the character continued to be portrayed with through the 1980s and early 1990s. Likewise, Parker abandoned the conservative suit and tie of the 1960s comics and previous animated series in favor of dark blue straight-legged linen pants.

Peter's mask was connected to his costume at the back of the neck, like a hood which he would pull over his head when he changed into Spider-Man.

Broadcast and home media release 
All 26 episodes have been released on DVD in the UK by Clear Vision, over four DVD volumes. To avoid confusion with other Spider-Man DVD titles, Clear Vision released the show on DVD under the name Spider-Man 5000.

As was the case with Amazing Friends, the series was later re-aired in the late 1980s as part of the 90-minute Marvel Action Universe, a syndicated series that was used as a platform for old and new Marvel-produced animated fare (the newer programming featured RoboCop: The Animated Series, Dino-Riders and on occasion, X-Men: Pryde of the X-Men, which was intended to serve as a pilot for a potential X-Men animated series). The show was last rerun in the US in 1998 as part of the UPN Kids Action Zone block alongside several other Marvel shows.

The rights to all Marvel shows were owned by Marvel themselves, before Disney acquired them in 2008. Currently, there are no plans for a DVD release in the US or elsewhere.

In Canada, Morningstar Entertainment released the episode "The Vulture Has Landed" on DVD in the set entitled Spider-Man Vs. The Vulture. The set also contains "The Vulture's Prey" and "The Dark Terrors", both from the 1967 Spider-Man TV series.  Morningstar also released "Canon of Doom" (on the Fantastic Four VS. Doctor Doom set, included in the Villains Showdown Gift Set that also includes "Spider-Man Vs. The Vulture"), although the episode is the Bonus episode on the disc. "Arsenic And Aunt May" was also released in the Heroes box set. All the Morningstar DVDs were mastered from VHS/Betamax copies that were released by Prism Video in 1985 as part of their Marvel Video Library series.

The series was available for streaming on Netflix from 2011 to 2013. The series became available on the Disney+ streaming service at its U.S. launch on November 12, 2019.

References

External links 

 
 1981 Spider-Man Cartoon at Toon Zone 

1981 American television series debuts
1982 American television series endings
1980s American animated television series
American children's animated action television series
American children's animated adventure television series
American children's animated science fantasy television series
American children's animated superhero television series
Television shows based on Marvel Comics
Animated television series based on Marvel Comics
Animated Spider-Man television series
First-run syndicated television programs in the United States
UPN Kids
Marvel Action Universe
Television series by Marvel Productions
Television series by Saban Entertainment